Pat Heard (born 17 March 1960 in Hull) is an English retired football midfielder and left-back. He was a member of Villa’s history-making ‘82 squad.

Early life and youth career
In the mid-70s, Heard attended Malet Lambert High School and played for Hull City Schoolboys and Humberside Boys. He was spotted by  Jeff Barmby who tipped off  Everton reserve team manager Ray Henderson. As a product of the youth system at Everton, left-footer Heard made eleven appearances for the club.

Professional football career
In October 1979, the young midfielder was signed by Aston Villa at a valuation of £150,000 (2015: £) in a deal which saw John Gidman move the other way. Heard made nine appearances in his first season at Villa Park but was not one of just 14 players used by Ron Saunders to become League champions in the following season. He scored a goal during a 4–3 defeat to Arsenal at Highbury  in March 1982 and scored the winner in a 0–1 victory away to local rivals, West Bromwich Albion in May that year.

Pat Heard won a European Cup medal after being named as a substitute for the 1982 European Cup Final. Although he was not used during the match, the following European Cup season, Heard played for the defending champions in the 3–1 victory over Beşiktaş J.K.

Heard left Villa in January 1983 for Sheffield Wednesday priced at £60,000; his new club's hopes of promotion from the Second Division had been dented by a recent slump in form. He was forced to take a taxi to Highbury, London for the 1983 FA Cup semi-final having been accidentally left behind by manager, Jack Charlton. However, when Jack Charlton moved to Newcastle United, Heard was the new manager's first signing. In October 1984 he scored in a 3–0 victory over Ipswich Town; his second goal came the following month in a 2–2 draw away to Luton.

In August 1985, Heard moved to Middlesbrough on a month's loan with a view to a permanent deal. 
In November 1985 he scored as Middlesbrough beat Shrewsbury Town 3–1 at home. Following his spell at Middlesbrough, in 1986 he joined his hometown club Hull City. Notable performances included scoring a penalty in the 2–1 victory over his old club, Villa, in August 1987. As penalty taker he also scored in a 3–0 away win at Barnsley in October 1987; and the 2–1 away win at Oldham Athletic in the Christmas fixtures that year.

Having been a first teamer for two seasons at Hull, Heard left to play for Rotherham United, winning the Fourth Division title. This was followed by Cardiff City during which time he turned down an offer from Norwegian club Randaberg IL to become their player-manager. He returned briefly to Hull before continuing his career with the Brunei M-League Team. A clash of heads fractured his skull ending his playing career at the age of 34.

After football
After football, Heard embarked on a variety of careers including as a publican in both Hull and Chesterfield, a summariser for Free Radio Birmingham, a stage hypnotist. Most recently, as an Approved Driving Instructor, Heard taught Villa youngsters Barry Bannan, Benji Siegrist, and Andreas Weimann to drive.

References

1960 births
Living people
English footballers
English Football League players
Everton F.C. players
Aston Villa F.C. players
Sheffield Wednesday F.C. players
Newcastle United F.C. players
Middlesbrough F.C. players
Hull City A.F.C. players
Rotherham United F.C. players
Cardiff City F.C. players
Expatriate footballers in Malaysia
Footballers from Kingston upon Hull
English association football commentators
Expatriate footballers in Brunei
British hypnotists
Brunei (Malaysia Premier League team) players
Association football defenders
Association football midfielders